1987: When the Day Comes is a 2017 South Korean political thriller film directed by Jang Joon-hwan and written by Kim Kyung-chan. The film stars Kim Yoon-seok, Ha Jung-woo, Yoo Hae-jin, Kim Tae-ri, Park Hee-soon and Lee Hee-joon. Set in 1987 and based on a true story, the film focuses on the events that led up to the June Democratic Uprising in Korea, triggered by the death of a student protester during police interrogation which the authorities conspire to cover up. Jang has compared the overall structure of the film to a relay race, with the focus of the story shifting between several characters to convey the collective effort of the political resistance. The film was released in theaters on December 27, 2017.

Plot
	Under the military regime of President Chun Doo-hwan, a student activist named Park Jong-chul dies during interrogation. Park Cheo-won, a ruthless commissioner in charge of investigating suspected communists, has oversight of the interrogation, and opts to cover it up, quickly cremating the body before an autopsy can be carried out and reporting the death as a heart attack. Commissioner Park's men approach a drunken Prosecutor Choi to approve the hasty cremation, but he refuses and resists their efforts to strong-arm him. The autopsy takes place despite Commissioner Park's efforts, with Jong-chul's uncle present as it is made evident the student's death was the result of foul play. The uncle declares this outside the hospital building, and Prosecutor Choi, after being fired, leaves evidence from the autopsy to Yoon Sang-sam, a reporter hoping to investigate the story despite a country-wide regulation against reporting on the death. Yoon's findings reveal to the public that Park Jong-chul died by asphyxiation, rather than the official police report of a cardiac arrest.

	With the public aware that the student was killed by his interrogators, Commissioner Park chooses two detectives to take the full blame for the crime. He promises one patsy, the loyal detective Jo Han-kyung, that he will serve a reduced sentence for involuntary manslaughter rather than murder, but is unable to fulfill this promise, leading to a number of intense altercations between Jo and his colleagues when they visit him at the prison. Prison guard Han Byung-yong, who overhears some of these exchanges, is revealed to be in contact with high-ranking political activists, and attempts to convince his warden to disclose the records from the visits, which provide incriminating evidence of a cover-up.

	Guard Han's niece, Yeon-hee, is a college student who occasionally helps him deliver messages, but is otherwise disinterested in activism. Yeon-hee finds herself in the middle of a violent clash between protesters and police, and is saved from a violent policeman by a handsome student activist. The two reconnect on campus, and Yeon-hee attends the activist's club where footage of the Gwangju uprising is shown during a meeting, but she remains resistant to joining the cause. Meanwhile, the warden finally agrees to disclose the visitation records after witnessing Commissioner Park threatening Detective Jo and his family, and being violently beaten by Park's cronies when he protests. Han asks Yeon-hee to deliver the records to his contact, but she refuses. Han attempts to do so himself, but Commissioner Park's men locate his contact before he gets the chance, and one of Park's men recognizes Han. They later abduct Han, and torture him in the same interrogation room where Park Jong-chul was killed. Commissioner Park reveals details of his childhood in North Korea, in which he watched a radical communist murder his family, while torturing Han.

	Remorseful over her uncle's arrest, Yeon-hee independently delivers the information to Han's contact. The information finds its way to the Catholic Priests' Association for Justice, who make a public statement that Park Jong-chul was killed during interrogation by the two detectives arrested along with three others, and Commissioner Park had direct oversight and attempted to cover up the killing. A flashback to Jong-chul's death is shown, in which Detective Jo taunts him by claiming that if he dies in that room, nobody will care. Commissioner Park discovers that President Chun has personally approved to have him arrested and blamed entirely for Jong-chul's death. Han is released, and returns to his family. Later, Yeon-hee sees a picture in a newspaper of the handsome activist she met, severely wounded at a recent protest — he is revealed to be Lee Han-yeol, a real-life student protester who was shot in the head and killed by a police tear gas canister. Devastated over the death of her new-found friend and benefactor, Yeon-hee finally joins the movement for democracy.

Cast

Main
Kim Yoon-seok as Commissioner Park Cheo-won
Ha Jung-woo as Prosecutor Choi Hwan
Yoo Hae-jin as prison guard and activist Han Byung-yong
Kim Tae-ri as Yeon-hee, niece of Byung-yong
Park Hee-soon as Lieutenant Jo Han-kyung
Lee Hee-joon as Reporter Yoon Sang-sam

Supporting
Kim Eui-sung as Lee Boo-young
Yoo Seung-mok as Yoo Jung-bang 
Hyun Bong-shik as Park Won-taek 
Jo Woo-jin as Park Wol-gil
Kim Jong-soo as Park Jung-ki
Kim Gook-hee as Han Byeong-yong	
Han Joon-woo as Black suit man
Kim Soo-jin as Yeon-hee's mother
Choi Kwang-il as Warden Ahn Yoo
Yoo Jung-ho as Reporter 
Park Kyung-hye as Jeong-mi

Special appearance
Sol Kyung-gu as Kim Jeong-nam
Yeo Jin-goo as Park Jong-chul 
Gang Dong-won as Yi Han-yeol 
Moon Sung-keun as Lt. Gen Jang Se-dong
Oh Dal-su as Yi Doo-seok
Ko Chang-seok as Jeong Gu-jong
Woo Hyun as Director General of Police Kang Min-chang
Jung In-gi as Priest Kim Seung-hoon 
Moon So-ri as Woman in the plaza (voice)

Production 
Principal photography began on April 20, 2017 and ended on August 27, 2017.

Music 
The soundtrack music was composed by Kim Tae-seong. There are 22 songs as listed below.

 "When the Day Comes" - Lee Hanyeol Choir & Daegun Chamber Choir
 "1987"
 "Namyoung-Dong"
 "The Portrait of the Deceased"
 "Father Has No Words"
 "1980"
 "Hidden Road by Yeonheui" - Kim Tae-ri & Gang Dong-won 
 "The Funeral"
 "Reporters"
 "A Time When the Wind Starts To Blow"
 "Press Guidelines"
 "Counter-Communist Branch of the Police"
 "I Didn't Kill Him"
 "Indirect Election"
 "Chase"
 "Heartbroken"
 "The Clue"
 "The Decision"
 "Final"
 "The Judgement"
 "When the Day Comes (Choir Version)"
 "Hidden Road by Lee Hanyeol" - Kim Tae-ri & Gang Dong-won

Reception 
Released on December 27, 2017, the film has drawn more than 7.2 million viewers in South Korea.

Awards and nominations

References

External links

 

2017 films
2010s historical films
2017 thriller drama films
South Korean political thriller films
South Korean historical films
South Korean drama films
South Korean thriller films
CJ Entertainment films
Political films based on actual events
Drama films based on actual events
Films about democracy
Films about revolutions
Films set in 1987
2010s political thriller films
2017 drama films
South Korean films based on actual events
Grand Prize Paeksang Arts Award (Film) winners
2010s South Korean films